Bio-Rad Laboratories, Inc. is an American  developer and manufacturer of specialized technological products for the life science research and clinical diagnostics markets. The company was founded in 1952 in Berkeley, California, by husband and wife team David and Alice Schwartz, both graduates of the University of California, Berkeley. Bio-Rad is based in Hercules, California, and has operations worldwide.

Business segments

Bio-Rad’s life science products primarily include instruments, software, consumables, reagents, and content for the areas of cell biology, gene expression, protein purification, protein quantitation, drug discovery and manufacture, food safety, and science education. These products are based on technologies to separate, purify, identify, analyze, and amplify biological materials such as antibodies, proteins, nucleic acids, cells, and bacteria.

Bio-Rad’s diagnostic products and systems use a range of technologies and provide clinical information in the blood transfusion, diabetes monitoring, autoimmune, and infectious disease testing markets. These products are used to support the diagnosis, monitoring, and treatment of diseases and other medical conditions.

History
Bio-Rad Laboratories was founded in 1952 by David Schwartz and his wife Alice, both recent graduates of the University of California, Berkeley. In 1976, Bio-Rad acquired Environmental Chemical Specialties (ECS), a producer of human control serum.

In 2008, Bio-Rad were notable for being the opening bell ringers at the New York Stock Exchange on 24 October, a date which went down in financial history as 'Bloody Friday', which saw many of the world's stock exchanges experience the worst declines in their history, with drops of around 10% in most indices.

In 2011, Bio-Rad acquired a new technology, droplet digital PCR. Droplet digital PCR allows scientists to distinguish rare sequences in tumors and precisely measure copy number variation.
 
In January 2013, Bio-Rad purchased AbD Serotec, a division of MorphoSys AG. This added Serotec’s more than 15,000 antibodies, kits, and accessories to Bio-Rad’s portfolio of research and clinical diagnostic products.

In 2016, the company had direct distribution channels in over 35 countries outside the United States through subsidiaries whose focus is sales, customer service and product distribution. In some locations outside and inside these 35 countries, sales efforts were supplemented by distributors and agents.

In 2017, Bio-Rad acquired RainDance Technologies, a droplet-based PCR systems manufacturer.

In March 2021, Bio-Rad announced a partnership with Roche.

Vickers Instruments
In 1989, Bio-Rad purchased the British instrument-making firm, Vickers (1828 - 1999), apart from their defense products, which were sold to British Aerospace. This company had been known until 1963 as Cooke, Troughton & Simms. Cooke, Troughton & Simms was formed in 1922 by the merging of T. Cooke & Sons, a York-based instrument maker founded in 1837 by the self-taught schoolmaster Thomas Cooke, and the London instrument-maker, Troughton & Simms founded in 1828 by Edward Troughton who began his apprenticeship in 1773.

Bioradiations
Bioradiations is an online magazine created by Bio-Rad that offers researchers case studies, whitepapers, tips, techniques, and topics related to Bio-Rad products and services. Bioradiations began as a print magazine that was launched in 1965 and was printed until 2011 and replaced with the online publication.

See also 

 Laboratory equipment 
 List of S&P 500 companies

References

External links

 Wall Street Journal profile

Companies listed on the New York Stock Exchange
Companies based in Contra Costa County, California
1952 establishments in California
History of Berkeley, California
Laboratory equipment manufacturers
Life sciences industry
Research support companies
Manufacturing companies based in California
Manufacturing companies established in 1952
Technology companies established in 1952
Medical technology companies of the United States
Technology companies of the United States
American companies established in 1952
Hercules, California